Club Atlético Liniers, also known as Liniers de Bahía Blanca is an Argentine Football club, located in Bahía Blanca, in the Province of Buenos Aires. The team currently plays in Zone E of the regionalised 4th level of Argentinian football Torneo Argentino B.

See also
List of football clubs in Argentina
Argentine football league system

External links
Official website 

 
Association football clubs established in 1908
Football clubs in Buenos Aires Province
1908 establishments in Argentina